Prasiola stipitata is a small green alga.

Description
This alga grows to no more than 1 centimeter long, is fan shaped with a distinct stipe. The vegetative frond is monostromatic. The cells in the blade are arranged in packets of 4 or more. In colour the fronds are dark green.

Habitat
P. stipitata thrives in high-nutrient habitats and is therefore often found in the spray water zone of shores frequented by sea birds.

Distribution
Rather erratic in its distribution. Recorded mostly from cold-temperate regions on both hemispheres, e.g. Iceland, the Faroes, Atlantic coasts of North America and Europe, including Great Britain and Ireland, as well as from Australia and New Zealand.

Reproduction
Sexual and asexual plants have been recorded.

References

Prasiolales